Schizovalva ophitis is a moth of the family Gelechiidae. It was described by Edward Meyrick in 1913. It is found in South Africa.

The wingspan is about 23 mm. The forewings are fuscous, with a few scattered black scales and with some ochreous-whitish suffusion towards the median third of the dorsum. There is a thick black median longitudinal streak from the base to two-thirds, lower edge suffused, upper sharply marked, forming two deep sinuations filled with ochreous whitish before and beyond the middle and a triangular prominence between these. There is a short suffused blackish apical streak, and one less marked beneath it, surrounded with a purplish tinge. The hindwings are fuscous.

References

Endemic moths of South Africa
Moths described in 1913
Schizovalva